This is a list of people executed in the United States in 2021. A total of eleven people, ten male and one female, were executed in the United States in 2021, all by lethal injection. With only eleven executions occurring throughout the year, 2021 saw the fewest number of executions within a single year since 1988.

List of people executed in the United States in 2021

Demographics

Executions in recent years

Canceled executions
A number of executions were canceled in 2021. Two executions in Tennessee were stayed indefinitely because of the COVID-19 pandemic. Three executions in Texas were also stayed to review intellectual disability claims. Five more executions in Texas were reprieved due to the state not allowing the inmate's pastors to lay their hands on them during the execution. Three executions in Ohio were reprieved due to the unofficial moratorium in place on capital punishment in Ohio by Governor Mike DeWine, due to problems in securing the drugs needed for lethal injections. All three of these executions were rescheduled for 2024. An execution in Pennsylvania was also reprieved due to the moratorium in place on capital punishment in Pennsylvania by Governor Tom Wolf. An execution in Idaho was stayed by the Idaho Commission of Pardons and Parole after they granted a request for a commutation hearing. Attorneys from both sides agreed to the stay of execution until the hearing concluded in November 2021.

Two executions in South Carolina were stayed by the South Carolina Supreme Court because the state did not have a way of carrying out execution by firing squad. The new capital punishment law in the state requires inmates to pick between the electric chair or firing squad. South Carolina currently has no way of executing inmates via firing squad, meaning the inmates had no choice but to be executed via electrocution. The court ruled the inmates must have the choice available to them before they can be executed. The execution of Zane Floyd in Nevada was stayed by a federal judge, who ruled that the state needed more time to determine the constitutionality of the lethal injection drugs that would be used for his execution. The execution of Julius Jones in Oklahoma was halted hours before he was due to be executed after his death sentence was commuted to life without the possibility of parole by Governor Kevin Stitt.

See also
 List of death row inmates in the United States
 List of juveniles executed in the United States since 1976
 List of most recent executions by jurisdiction
 List of people executed by the United States federal government
 List of people executed in Texas, 2020–present
 List of people scheduled to be executed in the United States
 List of women executed in the United States since 1976

References

List of people executed in the United States
Executions
People executed in the United States
2021